Kubuli Parish (until 2011 officially known as Kubuļi parish) is an administrative unit of Balvi Municipality in the Latgale region of Latvia.

Villages of Kubuli Parish 
 Kubuli (parish centre)

See also 
 Administrative divisions of Latvia (2009)

Balvi Municipality
Parishes of Latvia
Latgale